Cyperus chinsalensis is a species of sedge that is native to parts of Africa.

See also 
 List of Cyperus species

References 

chinsalensis
Plants described in 1961
Flora of Tanzania
Flora of Zambia